Itas/Gadau is a Local Government Area of Bauchi State, Nigeria. Its headquarters are in the town of Itas Itesiwaju.
 
It has an area of 1,398 km and a population of 229,996 at the 2006 census.

The predominant ethnic group in the area are the Hausa in common with the other divisions of the state.

The postal code of the area is 751.

The main campus of Bauchi State University is located in Gadau.

References

Local Government Areas in Bauchi State